In the 2007–08 season, Trabzonspor finished in sixth place in the Süper Lig. The top scorer of the team was Umut Bulut, who scored nineteen goals.

This article shows statistics of the club's players and matches during the season.

Sponsor
Avea

Players

Süper Lig

Turkish Cup

See also
2007–08 Süper Lig
2007–08 Turkish Cup

Turkish football clubs 2007–08 season
Trabzonspor seasons